The Aviemore Dam is a dam on the Waitaki River in New Zealand. The dam is a composite dam, with an embankment section, and a concrete section. Built in the 1960s (and completed in 1968) it impounds Lake Aviemore. 

Aviemore Dam is owned and operated by Meridian Energy, and its primary purpose is to power a hydroelectric power plant. It is a part of the Waitaki River Hydroelectric System, a scheme which supplies 30% of New Zealand's considerable amount of hydropower.

Characteristics

Composite Dam structure
The founding conditions of the dam differ on either side of the Waitangi Fault, hence different dam construction types are used. On the northern side of the valley (Canterbury side), the dam is founded on greywacke rock, and consists of a -long concrete structure. During the construction of the concrete section, low-heat cement was first used in a large-scale application in New Zealand, to allow quick concrete pouring without the need for cooling elements. The dams spill outlets and penstocks are incorporated into the concrete dam section.

Hydroelectric facilities

Seismic enhancement
In the mid 2000's (decade), work was undertaken to enhance the dam and its appurtenant structures against the effects of earthquake loads, and to reduce the risk of overtopping resulting from earthquake-induced seiche waves in Lake Aviemore, in the event of rupture of the Waitangi Fault. 

At the time of construction the Waitangi fault had been considered inactive, but investigations in the early 2000's found the fault to be active (but with low probability of movement). The analysis and safety evaluation of the dam, and design of enhancements was led by URS Consultants, who received an ACENZ Innovate NZ Silver Award for their safety evaluation & upgrade.

References

Further reading

External links

Meridian Energy power stations (from Meridian Energy)

Dams completed in 1968
Energy infrastructure completed in 1968
Dams in New Zealand
Geography of Otago
Buildings and structures in Otago
Geography of Canterbury, New Zealand
Buildings and structures in Canterbury, New Zealand
Hydroelectric power stations in New Zealand
1960s architecture in New Zealand